Obarde  is a village in the municipality of Pljevlja, Montenegro. It is located near the Serbian border.

Demographics
According to the 2003 census, the village had a population of 165 people.

According to the 2011 census, its population was 125.

References

Populated places in Pljevlja Municipality